Talang may refer to:

The word Talang means "talent" in Swedish.
Mount Talang, an active volcano in West Sumatra, Indonesia
Talang, Iran, a village in Sistan and Baluchestan Province, Iran
Talang-e Anbari, a village in Hormozgan Province, Iran
Talang-e Saratak, a village in Hormozgan Province, Iran
 a district in Phuket Province, Thailand
 a district in Candaba, Pampanga, Philippines
 Talang, a Swedish television show based on Got Talent